Patrizia Sberti  (born 6 July 1969) is an Italian footballer who played as a forward for the Italy women's national football team. She was part of the team at the 1999 FIFA Women's World Cup.

References

External links
 

1969 births
Living people
Italian women's footballers
Italy women's international footballers
Place of birth missing (living people)
1999 FIFA Women's World Cup players
Women's association football forwards
Serie A (women's football) players
ACF Firenze players
S.S. Lazio Women 2015 players
Torres Calcio Femminile players